The Beijing Union University (Abbreviation: BUU) is a municipal university administered by the Beijing government of China. In order to facilitate the municipal development, BUU was established in the 1980s, incorporating vocational schools and taking over some of the satellite campuses affiliated to universities including Peking University, Tsinghua University, Renmin University, Beijing Foreign Studies University, Beijing International Studies University, etc.

References

External links
Official website

Educational institutions established in 1985
1985 establishments in China